The master race is a pseudoscientific concept in Nazi ideology in which the putative "Aryan race" is deemed the pinnacle of human racial hierarchy. Members were referred to as "Herrenmenschen" ("master humans").

The Nazi theorist Alfred Rosenberg believed that the "Nordic race" was descended from "Proto-Indo-Europeans", who he believed had pre-historically dwelt on the North German Plain and may have ultimately originated on the lost continent of Atlantis. The Nazis declared that the Aryans were superior to all other races, and believed they were entitled to expand territorially. The actual policy that was implemented by the Nazis resulted in the Aryan certificate. This document, which was required by law for all citizens of the Reich, was the "Lesser Aryan certificate" (Kleiner Ariernachweis) and could be obtained through an Ahnenpass, which required the owner to trace their lineage through baptism, birth certificates, or certified proof thereof that all grandparents were of "Aryan descent".

The Slavs, Gypsies, and Jews were defined as being racially inferior and non-Aryan "Untermenschen", and were thus considered to be a danger to the Aryan or Germanic master race. According to the Nazi secret Hunger Plan and Generalplan Ost, the Slavic population was to be removed from Central Europe through expulsion, enslavement, starvation, and extermination, except for a small percentage who were deemed to be non-Slavic descendants of Germanic settlers, and thus suitable for Germanisation.

Historical background
Early attempts to claim a racial division between "masters" and "slaves", or the belief that a nation's ruling class is biologically superior to its ruled subjects, were made in the 18th century. Henri de Boulainvilliers in his book History of the Ancient Government of France (published posthumously in 1727) tried to prove that in France, the nobility represented the descendants of the old Frankish ruling class, whereas the rest of the population was descended from the subject Gauls. Therefore two qualitatively different races were confronting one another, and the only way to abolish the superiority of the Franks was to destroy their civilization. Classical liberal theorists such as Volney and Sieyès discredited this theory by showing that the French nobility consisted mostly of nouveaux riches who came from all parts of the country, and thus the idea of a racially pure Frankish lineage was fraudulent.

In 1855, French count Arthur de Gobineau published his infamous work An Essay on the Inequality of the Human Races. Expanding upon Boulainvilliers' use of ethnography to defend the Ancien Régime against the claims of the Third Estate, Gobineau divides the human species into three major groupings, white, yellow and black, claiming to demonstrate that "history springs only from contact with the white races." Among the white races, he distinguishes the Aryan race as the pinnacle of human development, the basis of all European aristocracies. However, inevitable miscegenation led to the "downfall of civilizations".

Gobineau's influence was slight at first. In his letters to Alexis de Tocqueville, he complained that his book was being hushed up in France and was having a real effect only in the United States. Tocqueville, who rejected the book in spite of his friendship with Gobineau, pointed out to him that this was because the book was in accord with the slave owners' interests in the Southern states. However, in the 1880s the book gained popularity in Germany thanks to the efforts of Cosima Wagner. In 1899, Houston Stewart Chamberlain, a Germanophile Englishman and Cosima Wagner's son-in-law, published The Foundations of the Nineteenth Century. Expanding upon Gobineau's earlier theories, he argued that Western civilization is deeply marked by the influence of the Teutonic peoples. Chamberlain grouped all European peoples—not just Germans, but Celts, Slavs, Greeks, and Latins—into the "Aryan race", a race built on the ancient Proto-Indo-European culture. At the helm of the Aryan race, and, indeed, all races, he saw the Nordic or Teutonic peoples.

The "Übermensch" (German) ("Overman" or "Superman") is a concept in the philosophy of German philosopher Friedrich Nietzsche—he posited the "Übermensch" as a goal for humanity to set for itself in his 1883 book Thus Spoke Zarathustra. However, Nietzsche never developed the concept on racial grounds. Instead, the "Übermensch" "seems to be the ideal aim of spiritual development more than a biological goal". Nazism distorted the concept's real meaning in order to make it fit its 'master race' view.

By the late 19th and early 20th centuries, it was postulated that Indo-Europeans (who were generally referred to as "Aryans") made up the highest branch of humanity because their civilization was the most technologically advanced. This reasoning was simultaneously intertwined with Nordicism, which proclaimed that the "Nordic race" was the "purest" form of the Aryan race. Today, this view is regarded as a form of scientific racism and contradicts the belief in racial equality by advocating the view that one race is superior to all other races.

Eugenics
Eugenics came to play a prominent role in this racial thought as a way to improve and maintain the purity of the Aryan master race. Eugenics was a concept adhered to by many thinkers in the 1910s, 1920s, and 1930s, such as Margaret Sanger, Marie Stopes, H. G. Wells, Woodrow Wilson, Theodore Roosevelt, Madison Grant, Émile Zola, George Bernard Shaw, John Maynard Keynes, John Harvey Kellogg, Linus Pauling, and Sidney Webb.

In 1908, the first "Better Babies" competition was held at the Louisiana State Fair. Babies were judged using the kinds of standards used to judge livestock: height, weight, unblemished skin, well-formed fingers, lack of unnecessary fat, and cooperative behavior. The purpose was to develop child-breeding health standards. At the Kansas State Fair beginning in 1920, a "Fitter Family" contest, sponsored by the American Eugenics Society's Committee on Popular Education, family members had to submit an "Abridged Record of Family Traits" and were then administered physical and psychological examinations to determine their "fitness", or eugenic health. Contestants received letter grades and the winners – almost always white and of Western and Northern European background – were awarded trophies. Some years later, contestants in the Miss America contest beginning in 1935 were required be "of the white race" and had to submit a detailed account of their ancestry; those who had backgrounds connecting them to the Pilgrims' arrival on the Mayflower or the American Revolutionary War received an advantage.

The Nazis took this concept to an extreme by establishing a program to systematically genetically enhance the Nordic Aryans themselves through a program of Nazi eugenics, based on the eugenics laws of the US state of California, to create a super race.

Hierarchy
The modern concept of the master race is generally derived from a 19th-century racial theory, which posited a hierarchy of races that was based on darkness of skin colour. This 19th-century concept was initially developed by Count Joseph Arthur De Gobineau. Gobineau's basic concept, as further refined and developed in Nazism, placed black Indigenous Australians and Equatorial Africans at the bottom of the hierarchy, while white Northern and Western Europeans (which consisted of Germans, Swedes, Icelanders, Norwegians, Danes, British, Irish, Dutch, Belgian and Northern French) were placed at its top; olive skinned white Southern Europeans (who consisted of Southern French, Portuguese, Spaniards, Italians, Romanians, and Greeks, i.e., those who were called the Mediterranean race, were regarded as another sub-race of the Caucasian race) and placed in its upper middle ranks; and the Semitic and Hamitic races (supposed sub-races of the Caucasian race) were placed in its lower-middle ranks (because the Jews, were Semites, the Nazis believed their cleverness made them extremely dangerous—they had their own plan for Jewish world domination, a conspiracy which needed to be opposed by all thoughtful Aryans). Slavs such as Poles and Russians were not considered Aryans; and neither were the members of the Mongoloid race (including its offshoots such as Malayans, American Indians) and mixed-race people such as Eurasians, the bronze Mestizos, Mulattos, Afro-Asians, and Zambos were placed in its lower middle ranks. However, the Japanese were considered honorary Aryans.

In their attempt to scientifically prove the racial inferiority of Slavs, German (and Austrian) racial scientists were forced to gloss over their findings which consistently proved that Early Slavs were dolicocephalic and fair haired, i.e., "Nordic", while the South Slavic "Dinaric" sub-race was often viewed favourable. Nazis used the term "Slavic race", and considered Slavs to be non-Aryan. The concept of a Slavic "Untermensch" accompanied their political goals, and it was particularly aimed at Poles and Russians. Germany's immediate goal was Drang nach Osten or expansion into the East, which was the first phase in its ultimate plan to conquer Europe, and Ukraine's "chernozem" (black earth) soil was regarded as a particularly desirable zone for colonization by the "Herrenvolk" ("master people").

In relation to the Nazis' belief in racial purity, author and historian Lucy Dawidowicz wrote:

'Master race' in the United States
In the United States, the concept of 'master race' arose within the context of master-slave race relations in the slavery-based society of historical America – particularly in the South in the mid-19th century. It was based upon both the experience of slavery and the pseudo-scientific justifications for racial slavery, but also on the relations between whites in the South and North, particularly during the American Civil War.

Benjamin W. Leigh, representing Virginia in the United States Senate, said in a speech of January 19, 1836:
There has been in Virginia as earnest a desire to abolish slavery as exists any where at this day. It commenced with the Revolution, and many of our ablest and most influential men were active in recommending it, and in devising plans for the accomplishment of it. The Legislature encouraged and facilitated emancipation by the owners, and many slaves were so emancipated. The leaning of the courts of justice was always in favorem libertatis. This disposition continued until the impracticability of effecting a general emancipation, without incalculable mischief to the master race, and danger of utter destruction to the other, and the evils consequent on partial emancipations, became too obvious to the Legislature, and to the great majority of the people, to be longer disregarded.

The Oxford English Dictionary records that William J. Grayson used the phrase "master race" in his poem The Hireling and the Slave (1855):
For these great ends hath Heaven’s supreme command
Brought the black savage from his native land,
Trains for each purpose his barbarian mind,
By slavery tamed, enlightened, and refined;
Instructs him, from a master-race, to draw
Wise modes of polity and forms of law,
Imbues his soul with faith, his heart with love,
Shapes all his life by dictates from above

where the phrase denotes the relation between the white masters and negro slaves.
By 1860 Virginian author George Fitzhugh was using the "challenging phrase 'master race', which soon came to mean considerably more than the ordinary master-slave relationship". Fitzhugh, along with a number of southern writers, used the term to differentiate Southerners from Northerners, based on the dichotomy that Southerners were supposedly descendants of Normans / Cavaliers whereas Northerners were descendants of Anglo-Saxons / Puritans.

In 1861, the Southern press bragged that Northern soldiers would "encounter a master race" and knowledge of this fact would cause Northern soldiers' "knees to tremble". The Richmond Whig in 1862 proclaimed that "the master race of this continent is found in the southern states", and in 1863 the Richmond Examiner stated that "there are slave races born to serve, master races born to govern".

In the works of John H. Van Evrie, a Northern supporter of the Confederacy, the term was interchangeable with white supremacy, notably in White Supremacy and Negro Subordination, Or, Negroes a Subordinate Race and (so-called) slavery its normal condition (1861). In Subgeneation: the theory of the normal relations of the races; an answer to miscegenation (1864) Van Evrie created the words "subgen"  to describe what he considered to be the "inferior races" and "subgeneation" to describe the ‘normal’ relation of such inferior races to whites, something which he considered to be the "very corner-stone of  democracy"; but these words never entered the dictionary.

The racial term Untermensch originates from the title of Klansman Lothrop Stoddard's 1922 book The Revolt Against Civilization: The Menace of the Under-man. It was later adopted by the Nazis from that book's German version Der Kulturumsturz: Die Drohung des Untermenschen (1925). An advocate of the U.S. immigration laws that favored Northern Europeans, Stoddard wrote primarily on the alleged dangers posed by "coloured" peoples to white civilization, with his most famous book The Rising Tide of Colour Against White World-Supremacy in 1920. Alfred Rosenberg was the leading Nazi who attributed the concept of the East-European "under man" to Stoddard. As the Nazi Party's chief racial theorist, Rosenberg oversaw the construction of a human racial "ladder" that justified Hitler's racial and ethnic policies. Referring to Russian communists, Rosenbeg wrote in his Der Mythus des 20. Jahrhunderts (1930) that "this is the kind of human being that Lothrop Stoddard has called the 'under man.'" ["...den Lothrop Stoddard als 'Untermenschen' bezeichnete."]

Nordicism

The origins of the Nazi version of the master race theory were in the 19th-century racial theories of Count Joseph Arthur De Gobineau, who argued that cultures degenerated when distinct races mixed. It was believed at this time that the peoples of Southern Europe were racially mixed with the non-European Moors from across the Mediterranean Sea, while the peoples of Northern Europe and Western Europe remained pure. Proponents of the Nordicism further argued that Nordic peoples had developed an innate toughness and determination due to the harsh, challenging climate in which they evolved.

The philosopher Arthur Schopenhauer was one of the earliest proponents of a theory presenting a hierarchical racial model of history, attributing civilisational primacy to the "white races" who gained their sensitivity and intelligence by refinement in the rigorous north.

The highest civilisation and culture, apart from the Ancient Indians and Egyptians, are found exclusively among the white races; and even with many dark peoples, the ruling caste or race is fairer in colour than the rest and has, therefore, evidently immigrated, for example, the Brahmins, the Incas, and the rulers of the South Sea Islands. All this is because necessity is the mother of invention because those tribes that emigrated early to the north and there gradually became white, had to develop all their intellectual powers and invent and perfect all the arts in their struggle with need, want and misery, which in their many forms were brought about by the climate. This they had to do in order to make up for the parsimony of nature and out of it all came their high civilisation.

Despite this, he was adamantly against differing treatment of races, was fervently anti-slavery, supporting the abolitionist movement in the United States. He describes the treatment of "[our] innocent black brothers whom force and injustice have delivered into [the slave master's] devilish clutches" as "belonging to the blackest pages of mankind's criminal record".

Hans Frank, Hitler's personal lawyer, stated that Hitler carried a copy of Schopenhauer's book The World as Will and Representation with him wherever he went throughout World War I.

The postulated superiority of these people was said to make them born leaders, or a "master race". Other authors included Guido von List, his associate Lanz von Liebenfels, and the British-born German racial theorist Houston Stewart Chamberlain, all of whom felt that the white race in general, and Germanic peoples in particular, were superior to others, given the purification of both the white race and the German people from the other races which were "polluting" them, a new millenarian age of Aryan god-men would arrive.

Nazi policy stressed the superiority of the Germanic "Übermenschen" ("superhuman") Nordic race, a sub-race of the white Caucasian race European population defined by anthropometric models of racial difference. The Nordic race was said to comprise only of the Germanic peoples: Scandinavians and the rest of the Nordic countries (Norwegians, Swedes, Danes, Icelanders, and Faroese), ethnic Germans (including Austrians, Banat Swabians, as well as Sudeten, Baltic and Volga Germans), Alemannic Swiss, Liechtensteiners, Luxembourgers, the Dutch, Flemings, Afrikaners, Frisians and the English.

The Nazi racial theorist Hans F. K. Günther first defined "Nordic thought" in his programmatic book Der Nordische Gedanke unter den Deutschen. The fact that Germans were not purely Nordic was acknowledged by Günther in his book Rassenkunde des deutschen Volkes ("Racial Science of the German People") from 1922, in which he described the German people as being made up of all five of his European racial categories: Nordic, Mediterranean, Dinaric, Alpine, and East Baltic. Most official Nazi comments on the Nordic race were based on Günther's works, and Alfred Rosenberg presented Günther with a medal for his work in anthropology.

Although the physical ideal of these racial theorists was typically the tall, fair-haired, and light-eyed Nordic individual, such theorists accepted the fact that a considerable variety of hair and eye colour existed within the racial categories they recognised. For example, Adolf Hitler and many Nazi officials had dark hair and were still considered members of the Aryan race under Nazi racial doctrine, because the determination of an individual's racial type depended on a preponderance of many characteristics in an individual rather than on just one defining feature.

Hitler and Himmler planned to use the SS as the basis for the racial "regeneration" of Europe following the final victory of Nazism. The SS was to be a racial elite chosen on the basis of "pure" Nordic qualities.

Giuseppe Sergi (1841–1936) was an Italian anthropologist of the early twentieth century, best known for his opposition to Nordicism in his books on the racial identity of ancient Mediterranean peoples. His concept of the Mediterranean race became important to the modelling of racial difference in the early twentieth century.

Aryanism and Nazism

The term Aryan is derived from the Sanskrit word (ā́rya), which is derived from arya, the original Indo-Iranian autonym. Also, the word Iran is the Persian word for the land/place of the Aryan (see also Iranian peoples).

Following the ideas of Gobineau and others, the Nazi theorist Alfred Rosenberg determined that these people, who, he claimed, were originally from Atlantis, were a dynamic warrior people who dwelt in northern climates on the North German Plain in prehistoric times, from which they migrated southeast by riding their chariots, eventually reaching Ukraine, Iran, and then India. They were supposed to be the ancestors of the ancient Germanic tribes, who shared their warrior values. Rosenberg opposed Christianity because to him, it was an alien Semitic slave-morality which was inappropriate for the warrior Aryan master race and in its place, he supported a melange of aspects of Hindu Vedic and Zoroastrian teachings (both of these religions were organised by Aryans), along with pre-Christian European Odinistic paganism, which he also considered distinctively Aryan in character.

In Nazi Germany, the Nuremberg Race Laws of 1935 forbade sexual relations and marriage between an "Aryan" and a "non-Aryan" in order to maintain the purity of the Aryan race. Such relations became a punishable crime which was known as Rassenschande or "racial shame". The League of German Girls was particularly required to instruct girls to avoid Rassenschande because according to Nazism, maintaining racial purity was particularly important for young females. Aryans found guilty of this crime could face incarceration in a concentration camp, while non-Aryans could even face the death penalty. The Nazis recognized the Germanic people as the master race, and several policies were implemented in order to improve and maintain the Germanic-Nordic ubermenschen Aryan "master race," including the practice of eugenics. In order to eliminate "defective" citizens and rid the country of the intellectually disabled or those who were born with genetic deficiencies, as well as those who were deemed racially inferior, the T-4 Euthanasia Program was administered by Karl Brandt, one of Hitler's personal physicians. Additionally, a program of compulsory sterilisation was also implemented and as a result of it, forced operations were performed on hundreds of thousands of individuals. Many of these policies are generally seen as being related to what eventually became known as the Holocaust.

The Nazis also undertook measures to increase the number of Nordics in Germany. The Lebensborn program was only open to German women who fit the Nordic profile. During the Nazi occupation of Poland, the Nazis took young Nordic-looking Polish children who were classified as being descended from ethnic German settlers in order to determine whether or not they were "racially valuable". If that were the case, the young children were taken back to these Lebensborn houses so they could be raised as Germans.

In Nazi Germany, the Aryan certificate was an official document which certified that its owner was an Aryan. Aryan certificates could also be obtained by citizens of other countries. In its section which is titled Racial Tenet (Rassegrundsatz), the Aryan certificate states:

For the "Greater Aryan certificate" Germans had to prove that as far back as January 1, 1800 "none of their paternal nor their maternal ancestors had Jewish or coloured blood". SS officers had to prove this reaching back to 1750.

During a speech he made in 1936, Nazi Propaganda Minister Joseph Goebbels said:

In 1943, Reichskommissar for Ukraine Erich Koch reminded Germans:

Mediterranean race

The fact that the Mediterranean race was responsible for the most important of ancient Western civilisations was a problem for the promoters of Nordic superiority. According to Giuseppe Sergi, the Mediterranean race was the "greatest race of the world" and was singularly responsible for the most accomplished civilisations of ancient times, including those of Mesopotamia, Persia, Egypt, Greece, Phoenicia, Carthage, and Rome. The Mediterranean race was also a major influence to the outside world in the modern era: during the 16th century, Spain and Portugal established the first global empires in Western history, placing both nations on the highest level of political and economic powers in Europe.

Charles Gabriel Seligman also stated that "it must, I think, be recognised that the Mediterranean race has actually more achievements to its credit than any other race, since it is responsible for by far the greater part of Mediterranean civilisation, certainly before 1000 BC (and probably much later), and so shaped not only the Aegean cultures, but those of Western as well as the greater part of Eastern Mediterranean lands, while the culture of their near relatives, the Hamitic pre-dynastic Egyptians, formed the basis of that of Egypt."

The Nazis explained this by pointing out that the original Latins and Greeks were Indo-European Nordic tribes which had migrated into Italy and Greece, respectively. The Nazis also claimed that the Spanish and Portuguese Empires were examples of Nordic power since, at the time, their governments were run by the descendants of the Germanic Visigoths who invaded Spain and Portugal fifteen centuries earlier.
However, they did admit that the masses of people who lived during the flowering of these four civilizations were Mediterranean. This led to Germans of all European races to be classified as Aryans.

Cultural influences
Aryan master race ideology was common throughout the educated intellectual community and literate strata of the Western world until the post-World War II era. Such theories were commonplace in early-20th century fantasy literature.

In the 1920s and 1930s, the original Buck Rogers stories and newspaper cartoons, Buck Rogers, in his adventures in the 25th century that takes place on Earth, depicts him fighting for Aryan-Americans from the liberated zone around Niagara, New York, against the Red Mongol Empire, a Chinese empire of the future which rules most of North America.

In the 1930s, both educational and storybooks for children in Germany taught their readers about the master race. In the Sun Koh science fiction series, the protagonist Koh says things like "My forefathers were Aryan", and in a story about Atlantis, he says, "If our Atlantis once again rises out of the sea, then we will get from there the blond, steel-hard men with the pure blood and will create with them the master race, which will finally rule the earth." The German writer Michael Ende, who was born in 1929 and grew up reading such books, wrote his classic novel Jim Button and Luke the Engine Driver in the 1950s, as a way of opposing the Nazi propaganda he was taught as a child. Frankfurter Allgemeine Zeitung writer Julia Voss wrote a book on Jim Button, uncovering Ende's many references to Nazi symbols in that book. Voss shows how Ende upends the Nazi belief that Atlantis was the original home of the Aryan race by creating his own submerged city and making it rise, but not to restore Aryan master-race rule over the Earth, rather it becomes a multi-racial paradise with Jim Button, who is black and a descendant of the Magi Caspar, as its king.

In the 1948 film Rope by Alfred Hitchcock, one of the central characters, Brandon Shaw, is a firm believer in the master race ideology.

In the Doctor Who series, the Doctor's frequent enemies, the Daleks, consider themselves a master race which must purge the universe of all other life forms; Terry Nation explicitly modeled them on the Nazis. In the 2009 special "The End of Time", when the Master transforms the entire human race into copies of himself, he claims that there is no human race, but only "the Master race".

In the Harry Potter series, while the parallels were not originally intentional, there is much similarity between Lord Voldemort's "pureblood" ideology and the master race ideology of the Nazis, with wizards being "pure" and anyone with Muggle (non-wizard) blood being considered "half-blood" or "mudblood", a word used and treated the same way a racial slur would be in the real world (Neo-Nazis call non-white people mud people).

In the film Lethal Weapon 2, the Master Race is a criminal organization of corrupt Afrikaner diplomatic officials from South Africa, led by South African consul-general in Los Angeles namef Arjen Rudd that smuggles illegal gold krugerrands into the United States of America via Los Angeles Harbor.

See also
Model minority
Herrenvolk democracy
Ketuanan Melayu

References
Informational notes

Citations

Bibliography
 
 

Nazi eugenics
Society of Nazi Germany
Nazi terminology
White supremacy